Dean Biasucci (born July 25, 1962) is a former placekicker in the National Football League (NFL) who played for the Indianapolis Colts and the St. Louis Rams.

Early years
Biasucci played college football for the Western Carolina Catamounts, and was a member of the team that reached the 1983 NCAA Division I-AA Football Championship Game. 

He scored 280 points (conference record) on 57 of 93 field goal attempts and 109 of 113 extra point attempts. His longest field goal was 52 yards and 80 percent of his kickoffs landed in the end zone. He was three-time first-team All-Southern Conference selection.

Professional career
Biasucci was signed as an undrafted free agent by the Atlanta Falcons after the 1984 NFL Draft. He played in one preseason game, making a 37-yard field goal attempt against the Minnesota Vikings. He was released before the start of the season on August 14. 

On September 7, he was signed by the Indianapolis Colts to replace an injured Raul Allegre. Biasucci was the team's field goal kicker for four games and would remain the rest of the season as the kickoff specialist.

In 1985, he lost the placekicking competition against Allegre. He was released before the start of the season on August 27. In 1986, he was signed to participate in training camp. He would pass Allegre on the depth chart and win the placekicker position.

Professionally, Biasucci is the third all-time leading scorer for the Colts, collecting 783 points from 1984 to 1994.

Personal life
Biasucci became an actor after his retirement, portraying himself in Jerry Maguire and receiving roles in other smaller movies such as New Alcatraz. He also had small guest appearances on ER and The West Wing. Biasucci was also a charter guest during an episode of the Bravo network reality show Below Deck Mediterranean.

References

External links

1962 births
Living people
Sportspeople from Niagara Falls, New York
Players of American football from New York (state)
American football placekickers
Western Carolina Catamounts football players
Indianapolis Colts players
St. Louis Rams players
American Conference Pro Bowl players
American male film actors
Miramar High School alumni